Khaneqah Bala va Pain (also Romanized as Khāneqāh Bālā va Pā’īn; also known as Khal’ge, Khānegāh-e Bālā, Khāneqāh, and Khangah) is a village in Asalem Rural District, Asalem District, Talesh County, Gilan Province, Iran. At the 2006 census, its population was 823, in 173 families.

References 

Populated places in Talesh County